Bobbi is a given name and nickname, almost exclusively feminine and usually a diminutive form (hypocorism) of Roberta or Barbara. It may refer to:

People:
 Roberta Beavers (born 1942), American politician
 Bobbi Brown (born 1957), American makeup artist and founder and CCO of Bobbi Brown Cosmetics
 Bobbi Kristina Brown (1993-2015), American reality television personality, singer and actress, daughter of singers Whitney Houston and Bobby Brown
 Robert Bobbi Campbell (1952-1984), early American AIDS activist and victim
 Bobbi Eden, Dutch porn actress and model Priscilla Hendrikse (born 1980)
 Roberta Bobbi Fiedler (born 1937), American politician
 Roberta Bobbi Gibb (born 1942), first woman to complete the Boston Marathon, three-time women's Boston Marathon winner
 Barbara Ann Bobbi Humphrey (born 1950), American jazz flutist and singer
 Barbara Bobbi Johnson (born c. 1945), Miss USA 1964
 Bobbi Jordan, American actress born Roberta Carol Bartlett (1937-2012)
 Bobbi Sue Luther (born 1978), American model, actress, film producer and host of TLC's Junkyard Mega Wars
 Bobbi Martin (1939–2000), American country and pop music singer, songwriter and guitarist
 Bobbi Mastrangelo, American artist born Barbara Ann Betschen in 1937
 Bobbi McCaughey, mother of the McCaughey septuplets
 Bobbi Rae (born 1991), British Illustrator and artist
 Bobbi Jo Steadward (born 1976), Canadian former ice hockey player
 Roberta Bobbi Sykes (1943–2010), Australian poet and author
 Evelyn Bobbi Trout (1906-2003), American pioneer aviator

Fictional characters:
 Roberta "Bobbi" Anderson, a main character in Stephen King's novel The Tommyknockers and the miniseries of the same name
 Bobbi Harlow, in the comic strip Bloom County
 Barbara "Bobbi" Morse, also known as Mockingbird (Marvel Comics), an agent of S.H.I.E.L.D.

See also
 Bobbi-Jo Slusar (born 1985), Canadian ice hockey player
 Bobbi-Bobbi, a supernatural being in the mythology of the Binbinga people of northern Australia
 Bobby (disambiguation), which includes Bobbie

English feminine given names
Feminine given names
Hypocorisms